MotoGP: Ultimate Racing Technology, known in the United States as simply MotoGP, is a Grand Prix motorcycle racing video game for Game Boy Advance, Xbox, Microsoft Windows, mobile phones, and N-Gage. It is based on the 2001 Grand Prix motorcycle racing season.

The game's features include weather effects, a dynamic replay mode and custom soundtracks. The game includes 10 real-world race tracks and all the riders and bikes from the 2001 MotoGP season.

An online-enabled demo of MotoGP shipped with Xbox Live starter kits in 2002. Players who didn't own the full game could access 23 riders and three courses while players who did own the full game could access all the content they had unlocked.

Reception

The Xbox version received "favorable" reviews, and the Game Boy Advance version received "average" reviews, while the N-Gage version received "unfavorable" reviews, according to the review aggregation website Metacritic. In Japan, where the GBA version was ported and published by MTO on October 25, 2002, Famitsu gave it a score of 27 out of 40.

MotoGP was nominated for GameSpots annual "Best Graphics (Technical)" and "Best Driving Game" among Xbox games, and was a runner-up for the publication's "Best Driving Game on Game Boy Advance" prize.

References

External links
 
 
 

2002 video games
Game Boy Advance games
Grand Prix motorcycle racing
Grand Prix motorcycle racing video games
Mobile games
N-Gage games
Racing video games
THQ games
Video games developed in the United Kingdom
Windows games
Xbox games
Multiplayer and single-player video games
MTO (video game company) games